Lapillopsidae is a family of Temnospondyli.

Lapillopsis was found as the sister to Rotaurisaurus in a 1999 analysis that found the Lapillopsidae as basal stereospondyls. Lapillopsis was found as a sister to Dissorophoidea by a 2017 analysis. Another relative of Lapillopsis, Manubrantlia was described from the Early Triassic of India.

References
 

Stereospondyls
Triassic temnospondyls